Cyrene Quiamco (born March 8, 1989), better known as CyreneQ, is a Filipino-American social media artist, influencer, published author and Augmented Reality Lens Creator. She is known for creating art on Snapchat. Her work has been featured in Forbes, Fast Company, Entrepreneur and Business Insider. She is considered one of the Top 100 New Cultural Icons by Vanity Fair and Cosmopolitan's Top 50 Most Fascinating People. She is the ambassador of the National Digital Arts Awards in the Philippines where she advocates the importance of art in education and career. Quiamco produced and premiered the world's first featured-length Snapchat-made documentary at the Bentonville Film Festival.

Early life 
Salathiel Cyrene Ganzon Quiamco was born March 8, 1989, in Bacolod, Philippines. At the age of 7, she moved to Arkansas, United States with her mother Christine Ganzon and her younger sister Chris Joy Quiamco.

Career 

Quiamco was a web designer for Verizon before becoming a full-time social media artist and influencer. She's known to make traditional, digital, as well as augmented reality art on Snapchat. She is one of the first people to create a full-time career on Snapchat by collaborating with big named brands on some of their first campaigns on the new platform. Quiamco was the first home-grown celebrity on Snapchat to be given verification and become an "Official Story." She's published her first book called 11 Seconds to Success, where she talks about her journey as an artist and also teaches the readers how anyone can take their passion and create a career with it on social media.

Recognition 
Quiamco was nominated for the 10th annual Streamy Award for Best Visual and Special Effects, the 8th annual for Best Immersive Content, and 5th annual for the Best Short Form Creativity. Quiamco was a finalist for the 7th Annual Shorty Award for Snapchatter of the Year and finalist for the 7th Annual Shorty Award for The Voice Snapchat Campaign.

References 

1989 births
Living people